Hugh Dempster (3 August 1900 – 30 April 1987) was a British theatre and film actor.

Born in London, Dempster made his stage debut in 1920, and began his screen career in the silent film era. His credits included Vice Versa, Anna Karenina, The Winslow Boy, The Fan, Scrooge, The House Across the Lake and The Ghost Train (short film).

Thirty-six years separated Dempster's first and last appearances on Broadway. He debuted in the 1929 melodrama Rope's End by Patrick Hamilton and in 1965 replaced Peter Sallis as Dr. Watson in the Sherlock Holmes-inspired musical Baker Street.

Dempster died in Chicago, Illinois.

Selected filmography
 The Great Well (1924)
 Lord Babs (1932)
 Music Hath Charms (1935)
 The Student's Romance (1935)
 Crackerjack (1938)
 Marigold (1938)
 Three Silent Men (1940)
 Candles at Nine (1944)
 Waltz Time (1945)
 The Trojan Brothers (1946)
 Anna Karenina (1948)
 Flesh and Blood (1951 film) (1951) 
 Happy Go Lovely (1951)

References

External links

English male film actors
English male silent film actors
English male stage actors
Male actors from London
1900 births
1987 deaths
20th-century English male actors